Delhi Light Rail Transit (DLRT) is a proposed light rail for national capital of India, New Delhi and Delhi region. Government of Delhi has proposed 3 corridors for this project. The total length is 45 km and feasibility study is completed.

Lines 
The followling three lines are included in phase 1:

 Phase 1
 Mehrauli - IG Stadium/Sachivalaya (Secretariat Building). (16 km)
 Mehrauli - Badarpur. (11.5 km)
 Mehrauli - Dwarka Sector 22. (17.5 km)

References 

Light rail in India
Transport in Delhi
Proposed railway lines in India